Steffi Graf defeated the defending champion Arantxa Sánchez Vicario in the final, 7–5, 4–6, 6–0 to win the women's singles tennis title at the 1995 French Open. Sánchez Vicario lost the world No. 1 ranking to Graf following the tournament, and would never recapture it.

The match between Virginie Buisson and Noëlle van Lottum was the longest women's match at a major, spanning 4 hours and 7 minutes. This record would later be broken by Barbora Záhlavová-Strýcová and Regina Kulikova in the 2010 Australian Open.

The tournament marked the first major appearance of future world No. 1 and two-time major champion Amélie Mauresmo.

Seeds

Qualifying

Draw

Finals

Top half

Section 1

Section 2

Section 3

Section 4

Bottom half

Section 5

Section 6

Section 7

Section 8

External links
1995 French Open – Women's draws and results at the International Tennis Federation

Women's Singles
French Open by year – Women's singles
French Open – Women's singles
1995 in women's tennis
1995 in French women's sport